The  is a professional wrestling championship owned by the Wrestle-1 (W-1) promotion.

Like most professional wrestling championships, the title is won as a result of a scripted match. There have been fifteen reigns shared among eight wrestlers.

History
When Wrestle-1 was founded in 2013, one of its main focuses was to build an openweight division, where its wrestlers would not be typecast as heavyweights or junior heavyweights, like in most Japanese promotions, but would be able to interact with each other across weight limits. However, on February 13, 2015, after Kaz Hayashi and Shuji Kondo had successfully defended the Wrestle-1 Tag Team Championship against Minoru Tanaka and Seiki Yoshioka, Hayashi announced he was interested in building a division for Wrestle-1's lighter wrestlers, electing to call the proposed division a "cruiserweight" division instead of the "junior heavyweight" division, which is more common in Japanese puroresu, and reminiscing of Mutoh and Hayashi's stints in WCW in the 1990s. This led to a match on February 22, billed as an "assessment match" to a possible cruiserweight division, where Tanaka defeated Hayashi. Following the match, Tanaka, Andy Wu, El Hijo del Pantera, Hiroshi Yamato, Rionne Fujiwara, Seiki Yoshioka and Yusuke Kodama voiced their support for a cruiserweight division in Wrestle-1. On February 25, Wrestle-1 officially announced the creation of a cruiserweight division and the promotion's third title, a cruiserweight championship.

In May 2016, Kotaro Suzuki made the title's first international defenses by defeating Mark Haskins and Ultimo Tiger in England at events held by 4 Front Wrestling and Pro Wrestling Pride.

Championship tournament
On March 9, 2015, Wrestle-1 officially presented the new title, naming it the "Wrestle-1 Cruiser Division Championship". It was announced that the title holds a weight limit of  that wrestlers need to make the day before a title match. Also announced was an eight-man single-elimination tournament that would culminate on May 5 with the crowning of the first champion. The championship belt was officially unveiled on March 31 at a press conference, where all participants in the tournament underwent and passed a weigh-in. On May 5, Minoru Tanaka defeated Kaz Hayashi in the finals of the tournament to become the inaugural Wrestle-1 Cruiser Division Champion.

Title history

Combined reigns

See also
World Junior Heavyweight Championship (AJPW)
IWGP Junior Heavyweight Championship
GHC Junior Heavyweight Championship
International Junior Heavyweight Championship (Zero1)
WCW World Cruiserweight Championship

References

General

Specific

External links
Official title history at W-1.co.jp 
Title history at Wrestling-Titles.com

Wrestle-1 championships
Cruiserweight wrestling championships